Springer or springers may refer to:

Publishers
 Springer Science+Business Media, aka Springer International Publishing, a worldwide publishing group founded in 1842 in Germany formerly known as Springer-Verlag.
 Springer Nature, a multinational academic publishing group created by the merger of Springer Science+Business Media, Nature Publishing Group, Palgrave Macmillan, and Macmillan Education
 Axel Springer SE, an important conservative German publishing house, including several newspapers
 Springer Publishing Company, an American publishing company of academic journals and books, focusing on public health and the like

Places
United States
 Springer, New Mexico
 Springer, Oklahoma
 Springer Mountain, southern terminus of the Appalachian Trail
 Springer Opera House, Columbus, Georgia

Animals
 In cattle, a cow or heifer near to calving
 English Springer Spaniel, a breed of dog
 Welsh Springer Spaniel, a breed of dog
 Springer (orca), an orca (killer whale) identified as A73 in her wild community

Vehicle-related
 Springer (tank), a small demolition vehicle of the German Wehrmacht in WW2
 The British Army's name for the Tomcar
 Springer fork, a type of motorcycle fork

Other
 Springer (architecture), the first voussoir of an arch 
 Springer (surname)
 Springer School and Center, a school in Cincinnati
 Springer (EP), a 2003 record by the Danish music band Efterklang
 Springer (Transformers), a Transformers character
 The Jerry Springer Show - also known as Springer - an American daytime tabloid talk show hosted by talk show host Jerry Springer
Big Spring Bombers, sometimes referred to as "Springers"
 Springer, an interstellar teleporter featured in A Million Open Doors, a science fiction novel by John Barnes

See also
 Justice Springer (disambiguation)